Gela Giorgis dze Ketashvili (born 27 September 1965 in Tbilisi) is a retired Soviet and Georgian football player. He won the gold medal at the 1988 Summer Olympics.

He is the father of Giorgi Ketashvili.

Honours
 Olympic Champion: 1988.

International career
Ketashvili made his debut for USSR on 10 May 1989 in a 1990 FIFA World Cup qualifier against Turkey. He was not selected for the World Cup squad. He also played for Georgia.

References
 Gela Ketashvili • Articles on FC Dinamo Tbilisi Official Website
 Gela Ketashvili • Articles on sovsport.ru
 Gela Ketashvili • Articles on sport-express.ru
 Gela Ketashvili • Profile on allfutbolist.ru 
 
 
 Gela Ketashvili • Profile on rusteam.permian.ru 
 

1965 births
Living people
Footballers from Tbilisi
Soviet footballers
Soviet Union international footballers
Soviet Union under-21 international footballers
Footballers from Georgia (country)
Georgia (country) international footballers
Dual internationalists (football)
Soviet Top League players
Erovnuli Liga players
FC Dinamo Tbilisi players
Olympic footballers of the Soviet Union
Olympic gold medalists for the Soviet Union
Footballers at the 1988 Summer Olympics
FC Guria Lanchkhuti players
Olympic medalists in football
Medalists at the 1988 Summer Olympics
Association football defenders
Recipients of the Presidential Order of Excellence